In computational fluid dynamics, the k–omega (k–ω) turbulence model is a common two-equation turbulence model, that is used as an approximation for the Reynolds-averaged Navier–Stokes equations (RANS equations). The model attempts to predict turbulence by two partial differential equations for two variables, k and ω, with the first variable being the turbulence kinetic energy (k) while the second (ω) is the specific rate of dissipation (of the turbulence kinetic energy k into internal thermal energy).

Standard (Wilcox) k–ω turbulence model 

The eddy viscosity νT, as needed in the RANS equations, is given by: , while the evolution of k and ω is modelled as:
 

For recommendations for the values of the different parameters, see .

Notes

References

External links
 

Turbulence models